The 1928 Bucknell Bison football team was an American football team that represented Bucknell University as an independent during the 1928 college football season. In its second season under head coach Carl Snavely, the team compiled a 5–2–3 record.

The team played its home games at Memorial Stadium in Lewisburg, Pennsylvania.

Schedule

References

Bucknell
Bucknell Bison football seasons
Bucknell Bison football